The Hugh Campbell Distinguished Leadership Award was first awarded in 2006.  It is awarded to an individual who has demonstrated great leadership and made significant contributions to the Canadian Football League.  This award has not been given out each year since it was created.
It is awarded to honour Hugh Campbell's years of service to Canadian football as a player, coach, and executive.

Award winners
 2022 - Rick LeLacheur, President of the BC Lions
 2021 - Dr. Bob McCormack & Dr. Dhiren Naidu — the CFL's Chief Medical Officers
 2020 – season cancelled - COVID-19
 2019 - John Hufnagel - Calgary Stampeders
 2018 - Wally Buono - Head Coach and General Manager of Calgary Stampeders (1990-2002) and BC Lions (2003-2018) 
 2017 - Paul Graham - TSN's Vice President and Executive Producer of Live Event
 2016 - Norman Kwong - first Asian born CFL player with Calgary & Edmonton winning 4 Grey Cups
 2015 - Bob Irving - voice of Winnipeg Blue Bombers
 2014 - Jim Hopson - Saskatchewan Roughriders
 2013 - Not Awarded
 2012 - Brian Williams – CBC and TSN broadcaster
 2011 - Rick LeLacheur - Edmonton Eskimos
 2010 - Tony Proudfoot - Montreal Alouettes
 2009 - Stan Schwartz, Calgary Stampeders
 2008 - Not Awarded
 2007 - Bob Ackles - British Columbia Lions
2006 - Hugh Campbell, Edmonton Eskimoes

References

Canadian Football League trophies and awards